Annie Gill (born in Ferozepur, Punjab, India) is an Indian television actress. She entered in television with as a game partner of Rahul Bose in reality show Khatron Ke Khiladi season 3. After she made her career with reality show Zor Ka Jhatka: Total Wipeout as Contestant. In 2012, she was approached in teen drama show Friendship Baazi as Anjie. Her first major role was in Anamika as Rano. She has done episodics in Confessions of an Indian Teenager and Savdhaan India @ 11. She was last seen in Anamika as Rano.

Personal life 
Annie was born in Ferozepur, Punjab, India and comes from a Punjabi Sikh family.

Television

References

External links 

Living people
People from Firozpur
Actresses from Punjab, India
Indian television actresses
Actresses in Hindi television
Indian soap opera actresses
Year of birth missing (living people)
Punjabi people
Indian Sikhs
Indian people
Indian women